Stevan Šupljikac (1786 – 15 December 1848), known simply as Vojvoda Šupljikac was a Serbian voivode and the first voivode of the Serbian Vojvodina.

Life 
He was born in Petrinja, in 1786. He had a brother Jovan who was also a fighter, and a sister Anka who later married Gabriel Miletić.

He entered the Austrian army in 1805, subsequently becoming a general. Between 1806 and 1814 he was officer of the Imperial French army. During the Russian Campaign of 1812, he was awarded with the Légion d'honneur. In 1814, he again served as officer in the Austrian army, as a commander of the Ogulin regiment at Banat and Lika. He then was brigade commander under Joseph Radetzky von Radetz, after which he was awarded with the Great Cross of the Iron Crown. In 1848 he took part in the suppression of Italian rebels in the Unification of Italy.

As part of the Revolutions of 1848, the Serbs under Austria-Hungary demanded what they had in the previous century; recognition of Serbian as official language, equality of the Orthodox church as with Catholics, and annual church assembly gatherings. They met at Sremski Karlovci and Novi Sad. Several thousand Serbs met at the May Assembly in Sremski Karlovci on 1 May 1848. The delegates chose Šupljikac as voivode, the civil and military commander. Josif Rajačić was elected the patriarch of the Serbs. The Serbs demanded a national unit consisting of Banat, Backa, Baranja and part of Srem, known collectively as Vojvodina.

During the revolutions, there was much fighting in Vojvodina, in June, Hungarian and Serbian bands began fighting. General Stratimirović, head of the main committee, on 10 May, urged Prince Aleksandar for assistance and asked Stevan Knićanin, a commissioner, to intercede. Knićanin was elected military commander. In June and July a large wave of volunteers from the Principality entered Vojvodina, Knićanin arrived at 25 July.

Hungarians were not friendly to the Serbs at this time, but support came from Vienna – the new emperor Franz Joseph approved the establishment of the Serbian Vojvodina, with Šupljikac as Duke. He became the supreme military commander of the Serbian national troops on 6 October. He died on 15 December, at Pančevo, he was buried in the Krušedol Monastery.

Aftermath and legacy

References

Sources 
 Jovan Mirosavljević, Brevijar ulica Novog Sada 1745–2001, Novi Sad, 2002.
 Barbara Jelavich, History of the Balkans: Eighteenth and nineteenth centuries
 Vojna enciklopedija, Beograd, 1970, Book 1
 Radoš Ljušić, 2008, Ilija Garašanin on Serbia's Statehood

See also 
 May Assembly
 Rulers of Vojvodina

1786 births
1848 deaths
People from Petrinja
Serbs of Croatia
Serbs of Vojvodina
People of Serbian Vojvodina
People of the Revolutions of 1848
18th-century Serbian people
19th-century Serbian people
Austrian soldiers
Serbian military leaders
Dukes in Serbia
Recipients of the Legion of Honour
Austrian Empire military personnel of the Napoleonic Wars
French military personnel of the Napoleonic Wars
Burials at Serbian Orthodox monasteries and churches